"Love from the Other Side" is a song by American rock band Fall Out Boy, released on January 18, 2023, through Fueled by Ramen and DCD2. It was released as the lead single from the band's upcoming eighth studio album, So Much (for) Stardust.

Background 
In December 2022, the band released began teasing a new song with claymation animation. The band also created a website called sendingmylovefromtheotherside.com. "Love from the Other Side" was announced on January 11, 2023. The song was released on January 18 and the band confirmed the album title, So Much (for) Stardust, and release date for March 24, 2023. The song marks a return to releasing music under Fueled by Ramen, with their last release under the label being Take This to Your Grave. It was also announced that the song and album were produced by Neal Avron, making it the first time Fall Out Boy had worked with him since Folie à Deux. 

Vocalist Patrick Stump discussed choosing the song as the lead single:

On the same day the song was released, lead guitarist Joe Trohman announced that he would be taking a break from the band to focus on his mental health, and would return to the band in the future.

Composition 
Jack Rogers of Rock Sound described the song as "a guitar-driven piece of modern pop-rock brilliance." Gil Kaufman of Billboard felt the song had "pop-punk energy". Alessandro DeCaro of Alternative Press described the song as "anthemic rock", harkening back to the band's earlier material, such as Infinity on High and  Folie à Deux.

Promotion

TV performances
The band performed "Love from the Other Side" on Jimmy Kimmel Live! the same day it was released. The song was performed alongside "My Songs Know What You Did in the Dark (Light Em Up)" and "Centuries" at the 2023 NHL All Star Game on February 4, 2023.

Commercial performance 
"Love from the Other Side" peaked at number 67 on the UK Singles Sales Chart. The song reached number one the Billboard Alternative Airplay chart in the week ending March 4, 2023. Fall Out Boy broke the record for the longest wait between their debut on Alternative Airplay and their first number one on the chart, as "Love from the Other Side" peaked 17 years and 9 months after their debut entry with "Sugar, We're Goin Down" in June 2005.

Track listing

Personnel 
Fall Out Boy
 Patrick Stump – lead vocals, rhythm guitar, songwriting
 Pete Wentz – bass guitar, songwriting
 Joe Trohman – lead guitar, keyboards, songwriting
 Andy Hurley – drums, percussion, songwriting

Additional personnel
 Neal Avron – production, mixing

Charts

References 

2023 songs
2023 singles
Pop rock songs
Fall Out Boy songs
Fueled by Ramen singles
Songs written by Patrick Stump
Songs written by Pete Wentz
Songs written by Andy Hurley
Songs written by Joe Trohman